Allen Salter (11 October 1936 – 13 January 2011) was a Canadian weightlifter. He competed in the men's featherweight event at the 1964 Summer Olympics. Salter was named as Ottawa's athlete of the year in 1962.

References

1936 births
2011 deaths
Canadian male weightlifters
Olympic weightlifters of Canada
Weightlifters at the 1964 Summer Olympics
People from Almonte, Ontario
Sportspeople from Ontario
Commonwealth Games medallists in weightlifting
Commonwealth Games silver medallists for Canada
Commonwealth Games bronze medallists for Canada
Weightlifters at the 1962 British Empire and Commonwealth Games
Weightlifters at the 1966 British Empire and Commonwealth Games
20th-century Canadian people
Medallists at the 1962 British Empire and Commonwealth Games
Medallists at the 1966 British Empire and Commonwealth Games